The Ardmore Open was a golf tournament on the LPGA Tour, played only in 1954. It was played at the Ardmore Country Club in Ardmore, Oklahoma. Patty Berg won the event.

See also
Ardmore Open - a PGA Tour event from 1952 to 1954

References

Former LPGA Tour events
Golf in Oklahoma
1954 establishments in Oklahoma
1954 disestablishments in Oklahoma
Ardmore, Oklahoma
Women's sports in Oklahoma